The Plum Tree Island National Wildlife Refuge is a National Wildlife Refuge in Poquoson, Virginia, located on the southwestern corner of the Chesapeake Bay. The  refuge is located at about the midpoint of the Atlantic Flyway, and is one of four refuges that comprise the Eastern Virginia Rivers National Wildlife Refuge Complex.

Prior to being transferred to the jurisdiction of the United States Fish and Wildlife Service in 1972, the preserve's lands were owned by the United States Department of Defense and used as a bombing range. Due to the amount of unexploded ordnance that remains, only the  Cow Island portion of the refuge is open to the public.

References
FWS page

External links
Plum Tree Island National Wildlife Refuge

National Wildlife Refuges in Virginia
Protected areas of Poquoson, Virginia
Protected areas established in 1972
1972 establishments in Virginia